Baptanodon is an ichthyosaur of the Late Jurassic period (160-156 million years ago), named for its supposed lack of teeth (although teeth of this genus have since been discovered). Major fossil finds of this genus have been recorded in North America. The type species, Sauranodon natans, was originally included under Sauranodon in 1879, but this name was preoccupied.

Discovery and species
Baptanodon is a replacement name for Sauranodon applied to ichthyosaur material in 1879 and was moved to its own genus Baptanodon in 1880 when Sauranodon was found to be preoccupied.
Baptanodon was considered a junior synonym of Ophthalmosaurus by Maisch & Matzke (2000). However, cladistic analyses published in the 2010s indicate that Baptanodon is not congeneric with Ophthalmosaurus icenicus.

Classification
The cladogram below follows Fischer et al. 2012.

Palaeobiology
Fossils of Baptanodon have been found in the Oxfordian-age Sundance Formation of Wyoming, which also has yielded fossils of the cryptoclidids Tatenectes and Pantosaurus, and the pliosaurid Megalneusaurus.

See also
 List of ichthyosaurs
 Timeline of ichthyosaur research

References

Ophthalmosaurinae
Late Jurassic ichthyosaurs
Jurassic reptiles of North America
Late Jurassic extinctions
Fossil taxa described in 1880
Ichthyosauromorph genera